Martín Salvador Orozco Trujillo (born April 11, 1995) is a professional Mexican footballer who currently plays for Cimarrones de Sonora on loan from Querétaro.

References

External links
 

Living people
1995 births
Mexican footballers
Association football defenders
Cimarrones de Sonora players
Querétaro F.C. footballers
Ascenso MX players
Liga Premier de México players
Footballers from Guadalajara, Jalisco